The Derby Nacional is a Peruvian Thoroughbred horse race held annually at Hipódromo de Monterrico in Lima, Peru. Open to three-year-olds, the Peruvian Derby is raced on dirt over a distance of 2400 metres (approximately  miles). Held in late November/early December, it is the third leg of the Peruvian Quadruple Crown.

The race was inaugurated in 1903 at Hipódromo de Santa Beatriz, the race 1940 it was moved to the Hipódromo de San Felipe which hosted it until 1961 when it was shifted to its present location at Hipódromo de Monterrico.

Records
Most wins by a jockey:
 7 - Antonio Vásquez (1951, 1953, 1956, 1957, 1959, 1960)

Most wins by a trainer:
 9 - Ambrossio Malnatti (1920, 1935, 1949, 1953, 1954, 1956, 1957, 1959, 1960)

Most wins by an owner:
 6 - Barlovento Stud (1963, 1968, 1970, 1973, 1974, 1976)

Winners of the Derby Nacional

* In 1948 there was a dead heat for first place.

References

 Winners of all the years 
 Derby Nacional 2011 
 Expreso~ 

Flat horse races for three-year-olds
Recurring events established in 1903
Group one stakes races in Peru
1903 establishments in Peru